Mata Hari's Daughter (French: La Fille de Mata-Hari) is a romantic adventure novel by the French writer Jacques Laurent, under the pen name Cécil Saint-Laurent. It is in a similar style to his popular Chérie series of novels. It features the daughter of the notorious First World War spy Mata Hari, who like her mother is also a dancer who becomes embroiled in espionage.

Published in 1954, it was adapted into a French-Italian film Mata Hari's Daughter the same year.

References

Bibliography
 Paul Mavis. The Espionage Filmography: United States Releases, 1898 Through 1999. McFarland, 2001.

1954 French novels
Novels by Jacques Laurent
French adventure novels
French novels adapted into films